Furulund is a light rail station on the Oslo Tramway.

It is located north of Vækerø in Ullern borough.

History
It was opened by Kristiania Elektriske Sporvei together with the rest of the Lilleaker Line, as an extension of the Skøyen Line.

During the last part of World War Two, the station was out of commission; parts of the Furulund neighborhood (or Furulunden) were seized for use by Gestapo as headquarters.

References

Oslo Tramway stations in Oslo
Railway stations opened in 1919
1919 establishments in Norway